Jitendra Nath Mohanty (1928 – 7 March 2023) was an Indian philosopher. He served as emeritus professor of philosophy at Temple University. Born in Cuttack, in 1928 in Orissa, India, Mohanty had a distinguished career where he stood first in all public examinations and in B.A. and M.A. examinations at the University of Calcutta. Subsequently, he did a Ph.D. from University of Göttingen in 1954. In his long academic career, he taught at the University of Burdwan, University of Calcutta, New School for Social Research, University of Oklahoma, Emory University, and Temple University and held visiting professorships at many renowned universities.

Mohanty's area of expertise included both Western (particularly German) philosophy and Eastern philosophy (particularly Indian philosophy). He wrote over twenty scholarly books and numerous journal articles on different areas of philosophy including epistemology, logic, and phenomenology. He wrote extensively on Immanuel Kant, founded Husserl Studies, and published a major book on the development of Edmund Husserl’s thought.

Mohanty was also a president of the Indian Philosophical Congress, the Society for Asian and Comparative philosophy. His other honours included a gold medal from the Asiatic Society, Kolkata, and the Humboldt Prize from the German government in honor of his scholarly work. He received an honorary D.Litt. from the University of Calcutta in 2013 and an honorary doctorate from Ravenshaw University in 2017.

Mohanty died in Philadelphia, Pennsylvania on 7 March 2023, at the age of 95.

Selected bibliography 
 Lectures on Kant's Critique of Pure Reason by J. N. Mohanty (edited by Tara Chatterjea, Sandhya Basu, and Amita Chatterjee) (Munshiram Manoharlal Publishers Pvt. Ltd., New Delhi, 2014)
 Essays on Consciousness and Interpretation by J. N. Mohanty (edited with an Introduction by Tara Chatterjea) (Oxford University Press, 2009)
 The Philosophy of Edmund Husserl: A Historical Development (Yale Studies in Hermeneutics) (Yale University Press)
 Between Two Worlds: East and West, an Autobiography (Oxford University Press, 2002)
 Classical Indian Philosophy (Oxford University Press, 2002)
 Explorations in Western Philosophy: Essays by J.N. Mohanty Volumes 1 and 2 by J. N. Mohanty and (edited by Bina Gupta) (Oxford University Press, 2001)
 The Self and its Other (Oxford University Press, 2000).
 Logic, Truth, and the Modalities (Kluwer Academic Publishers, 1999).
 Husserl and Frege (Studies in Phenomenology and Existential Philosophy) (Indiana University Press, 1982).
 Edmund Husserl's Theory of Meaning (Springer, 1976).
 The Concept of Intentionality (Warren H. Green, 1971).

References

External links 
Mohanty's profile at Temple
 A dose of old-school Indian honesty

1928 births
2023 deaths
20th-century Indian educators
20th-century Indian essayists
20th-century Indian historians
20th-century Indian male writers
20th-century Indian philosophers
21st-century Indian essayists
21st-century Indian historians
21st-century Indian male writers
21st-century Indian philosophers
Action theorists
Consciousness researchers and theorists
Continental philosophers
Emory University faculty
Epistemologists
Existentialists
Hermeneutists
Historians of philosophy
Humboldt Research Award recipients
Husserl scholars
Indian essayists
Indian logicians
Indian male non-fiction writers
Kant scholars
Kantian philosophers
Metaphysicians
Metaphysics writers
The New School faculty
Ontologists
Phenomenologists
Philosophers of culture
Philosophers of education
Philosophers of history
Philosophers of logic
Philosophers of mind
Philosophers of social science
Philosophy academics
Social philosophers
Temple University faculty
Theorists on Western civilization
Academic staff of the University of Burdwan
University of Calcutta alumni
Academic staff of the University of Calcutta
University of Göttingen alumni
University of Oklahoma faculty